Wan Mokhtar bin Wan Ahmad (21 March 1932 – 21 September 2020) was a Malaysian politician who served as the 11th Menteri Besar of Terengganu. In office for 25 years, he was the longest-serving head of the Terengganu state government (1974 - 1999). He also served as Member of Parliament (MP) for Kemaman (1964 - 1974) and Member of the Terengganu State Legislative Assembly (MLA) for Cukai (1974 - 1999).

Wan Mokhtar was a member of the United Malays National Organisation (UMNO) in the then-ruling Alliance and Barisan Nasional (BN) coalition. He was an ally of the similarly longest-serving Prime Minister Mahathir Mohamad. In 1987, he was elected the vice-president of UMNO, alongside Anwar Ibrahim, under Mahathir's running team.

His political prominence in the state came to an end in the 1999 state election, when the then-opposition Pan-Malaysian Islamic Party (PAS) ousted the Barisan Nasional (BN) state government with a landslide victory. He also lost his Chukai state seat then. He was then appointed as the Malaysian Ambassador to Saudi Arabia from 2000 to 2005.

Personal life
Wan Mokhtar was married to Aishahtun Mohd Fadlullah Suhaimi (1937–2018) and the couple were blessed with 5 children. One of his sons, Wan Abdul Hakim was elected twice consecutively in the 2008 and 2013 state election to be the MLA of the Air Putih state assembly constituency from 2008 to 2018.

Death
On 21 September 2020, Wan Mokhtar died at 6:20 am at Prince Court Medical Centre, Kuala Lumpur due to heart complications. He was 88 years old and is survived by his 5 children. He was laid to rest at the Section 21 Muslim Cemetery in Shah Alam, Selangor.

Honours

Honours of Malaysia
  :
  Officer of the Order of the Defender of the Realm (KMN) (1971)
  Commander of the Order of Loyalty to the Crown of Malaysia (PSM) – Tan Sri (1988)
  :
  Knight Grand Commander of the Order of the Crown of Terengganu (SPMT) – Dato’ (1975)
  Member Grand Companion of the Order of Sultan Mahmud I of Terengganu (SSMT) – Dato’ Seri (1983)
  :
  Knight Commander of the Order of the Star of Hornbill Sarawak (DA) – Datuk Amar (1982)
  :
  Knight Commander of the Order of the Crown of Johor (DPMJ) – Dato’ (1983)

References

1932 births
2020 deaths
People from Terengganu
Malaysian people of Malay descent
Malaysian Muslims
Chief Ministers of Terengganu
United Malays National Organisation politicians
Members of the Dewan Rakyat
Members of the Terengganu State Legislative Assembly
Terengganu state executive councillors
Ambassadors of Malaysia to Saudi Arabia
Al-Azhar University alumni
Commanders of the Order of Loyalty to the Crown of Malaysia
Knights Grand Commander of the Order of the Crown of Terengganu
Knights Commander of the Order of the Crown of Johor
Knights Commander of the Order of the Star of Hornbill Sarawak
Officers of the Order of the Defender of the Realm
20th-century Malaysian politicians